Amnat Charoen Province Stadium is a multi-purpose stadium in Amnat Charoen province, Thailand. It is currently used mostly for football matches and is the home stadium of Amnat Poly United F.C. The stadium holds approximately 5,000 people.

References

Multi-purpose stadiums in Thailand
Buildings and structures in Amnat Charoen province
Sport in Amnat Charoen province